Matt Mays is the self-titled debut album by Matt Mays, released in 2002.

Track listing

All songs written by Matt Mays, except as noted.

 

2002 albums
Matt Mays albums